Within the probability theory Markov model, Markovian discrimination in spam filtering is a method used in CRM114 and other spam filters to model the statistical behaviors of spam and nonspam more accurately than in simple Bayesian methods.  A simple Bayesian model of written text contains only the dictionary of legal words and their relative probabilities.  A Markovian model adds the relative transition probabilities that given one word, predict what the next word will be. It is based on the theory of Markov chains by Andrey Markov, hence the name.  In essence, a Bayesian filter works on single words alone, while a Markovian filter works on phrases or entire sentences.

There are two types of Markov models; the visible Markov model, and the hidden Markov model or HMM.
The difference is that with a visible Markov model, the current word is considered to contain the entire state of the language model, while a hidden Markov model hides the state and presumes only that the current word is probabilistically related to the actual internal state of the language.

For example, in a visible Markov model the word "the" should predict with accuracy the following word, while in
a hidden Markov model, the entire prior text implies the actual state and predicts the following words, but does
not actually guarantee that state or prediction.  Since the latter case is what's encountered in spam filtering,
hidden Markov models are almost always used.  In particular, because of storage limitations, the specific type
of hidden Markov model called a Markov random field is particularly applicable, usually with a clique size of
between four and six tokens.

See also
Maximum-entropy Markov model

References 
 Chhabra, S., Yerazunis, W. S., and Siefkes, C. 2004. Spam Filtering using a Markov Random Field Model with Variable Weighting Schemas. In Proceedings of the Fourth IEEE international Conference on Data Mining (November 1–04, 2004). ICDM. IEEE Computer Society, Washington, DC, Mazharul

Spam filtering
Markov models
Statistical natural language processing